Dortmunder means someone or something from Dortmund, Germany. It may refer to:

 John Dortmunder, a fictional character created by Donald E. Westlake.
 Tod Dortmunder, a fictional character from the TV show Little House on the Prairie.
 Dortmunder Export or Dortmunder, a style of pale lager beer.
 Dortmunder Actien Brauerei, a brewery in Dortmund, Germany.
 Dortmunder SC, a sporting club that was a predecessor to TSC Eintracht Dortmund.
 IAV Dortmunder, a ship of the Alliance in the television science-fiction series Firefly.
 Dortmunder, an early poem by Samuel Beckett.